Do Re Mi may refer to:

 Solfège, a system of learning musical scales (commonly: Do, Re, Mi, Fa, Sol, La, Ti)

Film and TV
Do Re Mi (1966 film), a Malaysian comedy film, and two sequels
Do Re Mi (1996 film), a Filipino musical comedy film
 Do Re Mi Fa So La Ti Do (film), a 2008 South Korean film
 Do-Re-Mi (TV series), a Czech amateur singer contest TV show

Music
 Do Re Mi (musical), a 1960 musical by Betty Comden, Adolph Green and Jule Styne
 Do-Re-Mi (band), an Australian band
 Do-Re-Mi (June Christy and Bob Cooper album), 1961
 Do-Re-Mi (EP), a 1982 EP by Australian band Do-Re-Mi

Songs
 "Do-Re-Mi", a 1959 song by Rodgers and Hammerstein from the musical and film The Sound of Music
 "Do Re Mi" (Woody Guthrie song), a folksong by American songwriter Woody Guthrie
 "Do Re Mi" (Jahn Teigen song), the Norwegian entry in the Eurovision Song Contest 1983
 "Do Re Mi" (Nirvana song), a 1994 song by Nirvana from the 2004 box set, With the Lights Out
 "Do Re Mi", a song by Verka Serduchka
 "Do Re Mi" (Blackbear song), 2017

See also
 Dough Re Mi, an American game show
 Doremi Labs, a developer and manufacturer of digital cinema and professional A/V products
 Doremi Fasol Latido, a 1972 album by Hawkwind
 Ojamajo Doremi, a 2000 anime series
 Doremi Harukaze, a character in Ojamajo Doremi